Maikel is a masculine given name. It is a form of Michael in the Caribbean, Netherlands, Spain, and Suriname, probably as a phonetic approximation of the English name. In the Netherlands, its first use was not until the mid 1950s and its popularity peaked in 1990. People with this name include:

Maikel Aerts (born 1976), Dutch goalkeeper
Maikel Benner (born 1980), Dutch baseball player
Maikel Chang (born 1991), Cuban footballer
Maikel Cleto (born 1989), Dominican baseball pitcher
Maikel Folch (born 1980), Cuban baseball pitcher
Maikel Franco (born 1992), Dominican baseball player
Maikel Hermann (born 1976), Spanish footballer
Maikel Kieftenbeld (born 1990), Dutch footballer
Maikel Mesa (born 1991), Spanish footballer
Maikel Moreno (born 1965), Venezuelan judge
Maikel Nabil Sanad (born 1985), Egyptian political activist living in the United States
Maikel Nieves (born 1989), Spanish footballer
Maikel Renfurm (born 1976), Suriname-born Dutch footballer
Maikel Reyes (born 1993), Cuban footballer
Maikel Scheffers (born 1982), Dutch wheelchair tennis player
Maikel Verkoelen (born 1992), Dutch footballer
Maikel van der Vleuten (born 1988), Dutch equestrian
Maikel van der Werff (born 1989), Dutch footballer

References

Dutch masculine given names
Spanish masculine given names